The women's doubles draw for the 2008 Bausch & Lomb Championships.

Seeds

Draw

Key
 WC = Wild card
 r = Retired
 w/o = Walkover

External links
 ITF tournament edition details

Doubles
2008 WTA Tour